In integrated circuit design, a critical area is a section of a circuit design wherein a particle of a particular size can cause a failure. It measures the sensitivity of the circuit to a reduction in yield.

The critical area  on a single layer integrated circuit design is given by:
 

References

Integrated circuits